Kenya Pipeline was an association football club based in Nairobi, Kenya. In 2002 the team won the Kenyan Cup.

Kenya Pipeline were promoted to the Kenyan Premier League in the 2001 season.

Boniface Ambani won the golden boot while playing for Pipeline in 2005.

The club played in the top flight from 2002 to 2005, when they disbanded.

Stadium
The team played at the 20,000-seat Nairobi City Stadium.

Performance in Caf competitions
2003 African Cup Winners' Cup: Second round

Honours
Kenyan Cup: 2002

References

External links

Kenyan Premier League clubs
Football clubs in Kenya
Works association football clubs in Kenya